Reach for the Top (also known simply as Reach) is a Canadian academic quiz competition for high school students. In the past, it has also been a game show nationally broadcast on the CBC. Matches are currently aired online through Reach for the Top's official YouTube channel. Teams qualify for national rounds through several stages of non-televised tournaments held at high schools throughout Canada during the year which are known as Schoolreach.

History

The televised Reach for the Top series was first shown on CBC Television affiliate CBUT in Vancouver, British Columbia in 1961. It was based on the BBC programme Top of the Form. In that first year, a team from three high schools in Burnaby, British ColumbiaFred Affleck, Robert French, Lynne Mader and Marilyn defeated every other team and took all the prizes. The first national Reach for the Top tournament took place in 1965, and was won by Vincent Massey Collegiate Institute from Etobicoke, Ontario. The series was filmed at locations across Canada with the national championships held in Montreal, Quebec. In 1968 joint effort by CBC and BBC led to the short-lived Trans-World Top Team in which teams from the United Kingdom played teams from Canada.

Alex Trebek hosted the Toronto version for several years, and was succeeded by Jan Tennant in 1973. In Vancouver, the show was hosted by Terry Garner (1961–1982). For many years the Edmonton host was Colin MacLean. In Windsor, the show was hosts were Don Daly and Marty Adler. In London, the show was hosted by Mark Lade, with judge Steve Officer. In Montreal, the show was hosted by Bob Cadman and by Marc Coté. Shelagh Rogers, later a host for CBC Radio, was a contestant on the original broadcasts of the show. Bill Guest (Winnipeg) hosted the National Finals on CBC from 1969 to 1985.

The CBC stopped airing Reach for the Top in 1985, but it continues to be shown under the aegis of Reach for the Top Inc. CFPL-TV, the former CBC affiliate station in London, continued to air local competitions for several years, and hosted the provincial and national competitions. From 2000-2008, the national finals were aired by CLT (now OWN: the Oprah Winfrey Network), hosted by Graham Neil of CFRN-TV in Edmonton. In 2009, the national finals were not aired except for the final game, which was filmed in the TVOntario studio. It is unknown whether or not TVO will air the 2010 national finals in its entirety. Until 2009, games at the provincial level were broadcast on stations unique to their respective provinces, among them Ontario on TVO with Nicole Stamp of TVOKids (and produced and directed by Sidney M. Cohen), British Columbia with Tamara Stanners on Knowledge, and Alberta with Graham Neil on Access. However, only Ontario provincial level games are now aired (by TVO).

In 1985, Reach for the Top Inc., a private company, was established by Sandy Stewart, on agreement with the CBC. Mr. Stewart then joined with his wife, Patricia Stewart, in partnership with Robert Jeffrey and Paul Russell of Paulus Productions Inc. to create Schoolreach, an in-school version of Reach for the Top available across Canada by subscription. Schoolreach is organized among the different school boards in Canada, and monthly tournaments are played, culminating in a district final each spring. The winner in each district participates in the provincial finals (which are televised in Ontario), and the provincial winner competes in the national championship.

Reach for the Top Inc. produced a season of programming in Toronto in 1986 and 1987. The Reach for the Top National Finals were revived in 1988. In 1995, Sandy and Pat Stewart retired from Reach For The Top. Reach for the Top and Schoolreach were then taken over by Paulus Productions Inc. under the direction of Paul Russell and Robert Jeffrey.

CBC created a similar program, SmartAsk, which aired for three seasons before being cancelled in 2004. From 1973 to 1997 the CBC's French language network, Radio-Canada, aired a program called Génies en herbe ("Budding Geniuses"), which was the French language equivalent of Reach for the Top. Competitions continued after the cancellation of the program, and teams from other francophone countries around the world often participated.

For the 1990-91 television season, Hamilton, Ontario's CHCH channel 11 broadcast a regional version of Reach for the Top hosted by broadcaster Alan Cross. At the time, Cross was a DJ at CFNY radio, but would later be well known as musicologist and host of his own radio show The Ongoing History of New Music.

Since 2014, the national finals are uploaded to their official YouTube channel.

Format
Reach questions include "snappers" that open and close each round of gameplay, which can be answered by any of the four players on either team. There are also "Who am I?" or "What am I?" questions and "shootout" questions, also open to any player. "Relay" questions are directed at only one of the teams, and "assigned" questions are directed to a single player. Questions are typically worth ten points, but can be worth up to forty points. Points are not deducted for a wrong answer. If a player on one team answers incorrectly, the question is then open for only players of the opposite team to answer.

Each game lasts for three rounds, with one-minute breaks in between. As of 2009-2010, each game consists of 86 questions, plus four sudden-death tiebreakers in the case of a tie game after regulation. Contestants may answer a question before the reading of it is completed; however, a correct, anticipated guess does not earn extra points.

The tournament is divided into three different levels. At the regional level, local high school teams compete against each other to determine who goes on to the provincial level. The winners of the provincial championships then go on to the National Reach for the Top tournament. The winning team is then declared the national champions.

Some districts also have "Intermediate" level competitions, where the questions are written with a lower level of difficulty to provide experience to new, younger players. Intermediate level champions do not move on to national finals.

Types of questions
 Snappers: Snappers begin and end every round, and are called "snapstarts" and "snapouts" respectively, and are of miscellaneous category. Four snappers, worth ten points each, begin the first three rounds, and end the first two. To end the third round and the game, there are usually 10-12 snappers worth ten points each. The tiebreaker questions are also snappers.
 Open Questions: These types of questions are open to both teams. Open questions are found in sets of two, three or four, and all relate to the same topic. Each correct answer is worth 10 points, and there is no penalty for a wrong answer. Audio and visual questions follow the same rules. Under the rules of the 2007 and 2008 National tournaments, incorrect answers given before questions in this category were finished resulted in a five-point penalty (a 'neg 5').
 Team Questions: A Team Question is actually a set of questions, worth a possible total of 40 points. When a team question is announced, both teams have an opportunity to answer the first question, called a "scramble". The team that answers the scramble first will have an opportunity to answer the remaining three questions, whereas the opponent will not. In the event that neither team answers the scramble, the remaining questions are open to both teams. In some leagues, the team question is forfeited completely. This is much like the tossup/bonus format played in quizbowl.
 Who/What/Where/What Word am I? Questions: The purpose of a Who/What/Where/What Word am I? question is to guess a person/place/thing/word. Clues are provided by the reader, and are read, one at a time. Between clues, both teams have an opportunity to guess the person/place/thing. If both teams provide incorrect guesses, the next clue will be read. This continues until the fourth and final clue is read. If neither team can provide a correct answer, the answer will be revealed, and no points will be awarded. What Word am I? questions provide up to four quotes with a missing word common to each. If a team provides the correct answer after being provided with one clue, that team will earn 40 points. Each subsequent clue reduces the question's value by 10 points. Unlike a good multi-clued pyramidal quizbowl tossup, the clues in a Who/What/Where/What Word am I? question do not necessarily give one unique answer, and sometimes the 40 point clue can be quite vague, e.g. "I am a European Country that has experienced war".
 Chain Snappers: Chain snappers are similar to snappers, but each question is somehow related to the preceding answer. These are usually found in groups of 6, and can replace a snapper set to end a round.
 Assigned questions: Assigned questions are found in sets of eight—four questions per team. A question is assigned to each person; if the person cannot answer the question correctly, his/her opponent (sitting directly across from him/her) will have an opportunity to answer. Players may not consult with their teammates when they are assigned a question.
 Relay questions: Each team is presented with four questions, one team at a time. The first three questions are worth 10 points each, while the last question is worth 20. If a team provides an incorrect answer at any point in the relay, the remaining questions assigned to that team are forfeited. Consultation is allowed.
 20-point special: A correct attempt at a 20-point special will earn 20 points. Some 20-point specials require more than one answer while others are a bit more difficult than the regular 10-point questions.
 Shootout questions: Shootouts consist of 12 snappers, and are open to both teams. If a participant provides a correct answer, he/she may not answer any further questions in the shootout. In this way, all four team members must answer a question to complete the shootout. A team will be awarded 40 points if they provide four correct answers before their opponents do. This will end the shootout. If neither team provides four correct responses before the end of the shootout, no points are awarded. Prompting and consultation amongst the players is forbidden. A shootout sometimes replaces a set of snappers to end a round.
 List questions: List questions are open to both teams, and are worth a possible 50 points. The reader will introduce the theme of the question, and ask for five items relating to that theme. For example, if the theme were "Chemical elements", the reader could ask for the first five elements of the periodic table. Teams alternate responses; if one team provides an incorrect response or repeats an answer, then the other team shall have an opportunity to name the remaining items in the list unless they too make a mistake in giving a wrong answer or repeating.

Eligibility
Participants must be "continuously enrolled in a secondary school" to be eligible for participation in Reach for the Top. The age limit restricts participants to those who are 19 or younger at the beginning of the school year. There are no rules about the language of instruction in a school or that a school must be in Canada, but the vast majority of teams come from anglophone schools in provinces with established leagues.

Quebec colleges, distinct post-secondary institutions, by definition do not fit eligibility requirements. However, given that the first-year of college is effectively equivalent to Grade 12 in other Canadian provinces, the participation of year one college students in Quebec has been allowed in practice.

Notable teams
In 1978, Vincent Massey Collegiate Institute (now separately Michael Power/St. Joseph High School) became the first high school to win the National Championship twice. They played their first game in March 1978 against Richview Collegiate Institute and future Prime Minister of Canada Stephen Harper in the first game of the Etobicoke, Ontario flight. Vincent Massey Collegiate easily won by a score of 445-160, with Harper scoring 80 points for Richview Collegiate in his first and only appearance on the show. Nicole Stamp, who was the host of Reach For The Top'''s Ontario Championships from 2004 to 2009, is also an alumna of Richview Collegiate.

In 2003, University of Toronto Schools (UTS), based in Toronto, Ontario, became the first school in Reach for the Top history to win back-to-back national titles. In 2012, it also became the first school to have won the competition three times. UTS then defended its title in 2013 successfully for a record fourth time. In 2018, UTS extended its record to five by defeating London Central Secondary School in the final.

In 2016, Kennebecasis Valley High School in Quispamsis, New Brunswick defeated Eric Hamber Secondary in Vancouver, British Columbia and became the second school to win three championships, with earlier victories in 2010 and 2011. Lisgar Collegiate Institute in Ottawa, Ontario became the third three-time winner in 2017, having previously won in 2015 and 2008.

Schools that have won the championship twice include Cobequid Educational Centre in Truro, Nova Scotia (1981 and 2005), St. George's School in Vancouver, British Columbia (1991 and 2004), Saunders Secondary School in London, Ontario (1992 and 1996), Gloucester High School in Ottawa, Ontario (1998 and 2001), London Central Secondary School in London, Ontario (2007 and 2009), and Glebe Collegiate Institute in Ottawa, Ontario (2021 and 2022).

In 1990, the champions from Memorial High School in Sydney Mines, Nova Scotia defeated the National Academic Championship team from Collegiate School of Richmond, Virginia 305-280.

Lorne Jenken High School in Barrhead, Alberta, which won in 1973 and made six other nationals appearances in the 1970s, was considered "the series' most successful competitors" in the 1985 edition of the Canadian Encyclopedia.

St. George's High School in Vancouver, British Columbia, qualified for the national finals every year from 1989-2007, except in 1994 when Magee Secondary School represented British Columbia. In 1991 and 2004, St, George's were the national champions.

National champions

Following is a full list of national champions of Reach for the Top since its inception in 1965, as published on their official website.

Notable alumni
Lucie Edwards, Canadian diplomat
Stephen Harper, former Prime Minister of Canada
Tom Harrington, Canadian journalist; member of 1974 national champion team
Bill Hastings, Chief Justice of Kiribati
Mark McDowell, Canadian diplomat and first resident Ambassador of Canada to the Union of the Republic of Myanmar.

In popular culture

 The Frantics included a sketch mimicking "Reach For The Top" (as hosted by Jan Tennant) on their CBC Radio program and 1984 debut album, Frantic Times.
 In 1989 CBC Television produced Pray For Me, Paul Henderson about a Reach for the Top team striving to reach the national finals.
 In 2018 Newfoundland author Joan Sullivan published Game, an oral history of Gonzaga High School's 1974 national finals win over Archbishop O'Leary Catholic High School.

See also
List of academic knowledge competitionsCollege Bowl, a former American television quiz show for college students
Academic games
MathCountsSmartAsk, CBC television show that was spun off from ReachSchools' Challenge, the UK schools national quiz.Génies en herbe'', French-language schools quiz on Radio-Canada

References

External links
Reach for the Top official site
Reach for the Top official YouTube channel (includes videos of national finals 2014–present)
Reach for the Top TVOntario Video Clips from 2008 & 2009 seasons
A rare Reach for the Top clip featuring a young Gord Tanner at YouTube

Student quiz competitions
1960s Canadian game shows
1970s Canadian game shows
1980s Canadian game shows
2000s Canadian game shows
Education in Canada
Student quiz television series
TVO original programming
CBC Television original programming
1961 Canadian television series debuts
Canadian educational television series